The 2006 JPMorgan Chase Open was a women's tennis tournament played on outdoor hard courts that was part of the Tier II Series of the 2006 WTA Tour. It was the 33rd edition of the tournament and took place in Carson, California, United States, from August 7 through August 13, 2006. Elena Dementieva won the singles title. Third-seeded Elena Dementieva won the singles title and earned $95,500 first-prize money.

Finals

Singles

 Elena Dementieva defeated  Jelena Janković, 6–3, 4–6, 6–4
 It was Dementieva's 2nd singles title of the year and the 6th of her career.

Doubles

 Virginia Ruano Pascual /  Paola Suárez defeated  Daniela Hantuchová /  Ai Sugiyama, 6–3, 6–4

References

External links
 ITF tournament edition details
 Tournament draws

2006 WTA Tour
LA Women's Tennis Championships
2006 US Open Series